16525 Shumarinaiko, provisional designation , is a stony Nysian asteroid and synchronous binary system from the inner regions of the asteroid belt, approximately 5 kilometers in diameter. It was discovered on 14 February 1991, by Japanese astronomers Kin Endate and Kazuro Watanabe at the Kitami Observatory on the island of Hokkaidō in northern Japan. The asteroid was named after the Japanese Lake Shumarinai. Its sub-kilometer sized minor-planet moon was discovered in 2013.

Orbit and classification 

Shumarinaiko is a member of the Nysa family, the largest asteroid family of the main belt, consisting of stony and carbonaceous subfamilies. The family, named after 44 Nysa, is located in the inner belt near the Kirkwood gap (3:1 orbital resonance with Jupiter), a depleted zone that separates the central main belt.

It orbits the Sun in the inner asteroid belt at a distance of 2.1–2.7 AU once every 3 years and 9 months (1,358 days). Its orbit has an eccentricity of 0.14 and an inclination of 2° with respect to the ecliptic.

The body's observation arc begins with a precovery from the Digitized Sky Survey. It was taken at Palomar Observatory in March 1950, almost 41 years prior to the asteroid's official discovery observation at Kitami in 1991.

Physical characteristics 

Shumarinaiko is an assumed stony S-type asteroid.

Rotation period 

In January 2013, a rotational lightcurve of Shumarinaiko was obtained from photometric observations by Brian Warner at the Palmer Divide Observatory in Colorado, and Dan Coley at DanHenge Observatory in California. Analysis of the bimodal lightcurve gave a well-defined rotation period of 2.5932 hours with a brightness amplitude of 0.08 magnitude, superseding the results from previous observations that gave a period of 2.6425 and 8.8 hours, respectively. A low brightness amplitude typically indicates that the body is rather spherical in shape.

Moon 

During the photometric observation by Warner and Coley in January 2013 (see above), mutual occultation and eclipsing events revealed that Shumarinaiko is a synchronous binary asteroid with an elongated minor-planet moon in orbit. The satellite, provisionally designated , seems to be tidally locked to its orbital period of 14.409 hours. It measures least 16% of its primary (Ds/Dp of <), which translates into a diameter of approximately 830 meters. There are more than 100 binary asteroids known to exist in the asteroid belt.

Diameter and albedo 

According to the survey carried out by the NEOWISE mission of NASA's Wide-field Infrared Survey Explorer, Shumarinaiko measures 5.253 kilometers in diameter and its surface has an albedo of 0.306, while the Collaborative Asteroid Lightcurve Link assumes a standard albedo for stony asteroids of 0.20 and calculates a diameter of 5.66 kilometers based on an absolute magnitude of 13.6.

Naming 

This minor planet was named after Lake Shumarinai. The lake is located within the Shumarinai Prefectural Natural Park in northern Hokkaidō, Japan. Artificially created to generate hydroelectricity in the 1940s, it is now known for its scenery. The official naming citation was published by the Minor Planet Center on 15 December 2005.

Notes

References

External links 
 Asteroids with Satellites, Robert Johnston, johnstonsarchive.net
 Asteroid Lightcurve Database (LCDB), query form (info )
 Dictionary of Minor Planet Names, Google books
 Asteroids and comets rotation curves, CdR – Observatoire de Genève, Raoul Behrend
 Discovery Circumstances: Numbered Minor Planets (1)-(5000) – Minor Planet Center

016525
Discoveries by Kin Endate
Discoveries by Kazuro Watanabe
Named minor planets
016525
19910214